"Top of the World" is a song written by the group Van Halen for their 1991 album For Unlawful Carnal Knowledge, released as the second single from the album, and spent four non-consecutive weeks at the top of the Billboard Album Rock Tracks chart in the U.S., becoming their eighth number one on this chart. It was the only single off the album to crack the top 40 on the Billboard Hot 100, peaking at #27. The main guitar riff from "Top of the World" is actually carried over from the closing guitar background riff from 1984's "Jump".

History
This song was recorded in early 1991; however, the main riff for this song was first played live on the Van Halen 1979 World Tour during "Dance the Night Away". 
Eddie Van Halen recorded this song using his brand new Ernie Ball Music Man signature guitar and his new Peavey 5150 amps. This was also one of the first Van Halen songs featuring the use of the wah-wah pedal.
This song also features Toto lead guitarist Steve Lukather on background vocals. This is the last song on For Unlawful Carnal Knowledge and was the last song played during live shows on the For Unlawful Carnal Knowledge Tour, following "Jump". 
This song was also played on the 1993 Right Here Right Now Tour, the 1995 Balance Tour, and the ill-fated 2004 reunion tour.

Personnel

 Sammy Hagar - Lead Vocals
 Eddie Van Halen - Guitar, Backing Vocals
 Michael Anthony - Bass Guitar, Backing Vocals
 Alex Van Halen - Drums, Percussion
 Steve Lukather - Guitar, Backing Vocals

Charts

References

1991 singles
Van Halen songs
Song recordings produced by Ted Templeman
Songs written by Eddie Van Halen
Songs written by Alex Van Halen
Songs written by Michael Anthony (musician)
Songs written by Sammy Hagar
Music videos directed by Meiert Avis
1991 songs
Warner Records singles